Asca pinipilosa is a species of mite in the family Ascidae.

References

Further reading

 

pinipilosa
Articles created by Qbugbot
Animals described in 1998
Taxa named by Wolfgang Karg